Fun Spot America Theme Parks is a group of amusement parks. Since 1979, the group has owned and operated a number of small amusement parks over the years and currently has three locations in Orlando, Florida, Kissimmee, Florida, and Fayetteville, Georgia.

Fun Spot America – Orlando
Fun Spot America – Orlando is an amusement park in Orlando, Florida, near Universal Orlando and I-Drive. It has 4 different go-kart tracks and three roller coasters: An E&F Miler Industries family roller coaster named The Sea Serpent, a GCI wooden roller coaster named White Lightning, and a Vekoma Suspended Family Coaster named Freedom Flyer.

History
Fun Spot America Theme Parks began in 1979 under the name Fun N Wheels near the I-Drive tourist corridor in Orlando, Florida. This 3-acre park near Wet 'n Wild Orlando, with no frontage on the main roads, had an arcade, three go-kart tracks, a miniature golf course, bumper cars, bumper boats, Raging Riptide (a 40 foot high water slide), and a 55-foot Ferris wheel. This park became the world's first themed action park, premiering new types of rides such as the riptide slide manufactured by New Wave Rides.

Fun Spot moved back to Orlando in 1997 and opened as Fun Spot Action Park (later named Fun Spot America – Orlando) near the original Fun N Wheels location on I-Drive. The $4 million,  park opened on December 24 featuring their signature, patented design of multi-level go-kart tracks, featuring three levels. The park also included a  Ferris wheel and a two-story video arcade among other attractions.

In 2010, Fun Spot purchased an additional 10 acres of vacant land next to their Orlando location. 2011 was spent researching nearly 30 parks and 50 roller coasters across the country planning a major expansion of the park. Late in 2011, they met with three professional roller coaster salesmen. Ground was broken in 2012 for the expansion that tripled the size of Fun Spot Action Park, turning it into Fun Spot America - Orlando. $25 million was spent on two new roller coasters, the world's second tallest Skycoaster (second only to their Kissimmee location), and numerous other attractions. The two coasters are the wooden out and back roller coaster White Lightning and the Suspended Family Coaster Freedom Flyer. The skycoaster came from MGM Grand Adventures in Las Vegas, where it had been disassembled in storage for 8 years. It is now the centerpiece of the park. Additional improvements include three new thrill rides, a new multi-level go-kart track, a new food court, a new ticket booth, additional parking, and rest rooms. A grand re-opening was held on June 8, 2013, celebrating the tripling of size of the park, as well as its 15th anniversary.

Fun Spot, in collaboration with Gatorland, opened Gator Spot at the Orlando park on May 11, 2015. The $1 million attraction allows Gatorland to extend their brand to the I-Drive tourist area, with visitors able to hold, take photos with, and feed alligators. The star of the attraction is a leucistic alligator named Bouya, a white gator with blue eyes.

Attractions

Fun Spot America – Kissimmee
Fun Spot America – Kissimmee is located in Kissimmee, Florida, adjacent to the Old Town entertainment and shopping complex. The park is designed as a circular walkway around the lagoon featuring the world's tallest skycoaster, the entrance of which is on the west side of the lagoon. The south end of loop features the signature multi-level go-kart tracks, the east side the flat slick tracks. In the north east side of the loop is the Arcade and Kiddie Area and the Rockstar Coaster is at the north end of the loop.

History
In 1988 a second Fun N Wheels location was opened in Kissimmee next to the regional mall. Both locations were sold in 1988 to Pleasurama USA, who also owned Hard Rock Café at the time, with the expectation of expanding the concept to malls region wide. This however did not occur.

In 2004, Fun Spot purchased the site of the world's tallest Skycoaster located in Kissimmee, adjacent to the Old Town entertainment and shopping complex. The site was purchased from Bill Kitchen, the inventor of the Skycoaster and owner of Skyventure. The site also included a recently opened G-Force dragster ride. Fun Spot developed the 9 acres around the skycoaster into another amusement park call Fun Spot USA in 2007 (now Fun Spot America - Kissimmee). They added 2 multi-level go-kart tracks, family/thrill rides and an arcade. Summer of 2011 saw the arrival of Fun Spot's first major roller coaster, the Power Trip Coaster at the Kissimmee park (now Rockstar Coaster). The Wild Mouse roller coaster, manufactured by Zamperla, was relocated from Cypress Gardens, where it was known as Galaxy Spin, when Cypress Gardens closed and became Legoland Florida.

Attractions

Fun Spot America – Atlanta
Fun Spot America – Atlanta is located on Highway 85 in Fayetteville, Georgia.

History
In 2017, Fun Spot America purchased an existing Fun Junction USA park outside of Atlanta in Fayetteville, Georgia.

In early 2021, FunSpot teased photos for an upcoming roller coaster coming to the chain's FunSpot Atlanta location. The project was formally unveiled on November 16, 2021, at the annual IAAPA Orlando Expo. Named ArieForce One, FunSpot partnered with Idaho based manufacturer Rocky Mountain Construction to construct a ground-up I-Box layout for the park. ArieForce One is set to open in 2023.

Attractions

Former parks
 Myrtle Beach, South Carolina (opened in 1990, closed in 1998)
 Virginia Beach, Virginia (opened in 1992, closed in 1998)

Awards
Fun Spot was awarded the 2012 Brass Ring for "Top Family Entertainment Center (FEC) - North America" by the International Association of Amusement Parks and Attractions (IAAPA).

References

External links

Orlando - 
Kissimmee - 

Amusement parks in Orlando, Florida
Tourist attractions in Greater Orlando
Tourist attractions in Orange County, Florida
1979 establishments in Florida